Percy Ernest Harold 'Dub' Daykin (7 July 1890 – 19 June 1965) was an Australian rules footballer who played for Carlton in the Victorian Football League (VFL).

Daykin competed in finals football in each of his seasons at Carlton, 16 matches in all, resulting in 13 goals. He was a member of Carlton premiership teams in 1914 and 1915, as well as their losing Grand Final teams of 1916 and 1921.

A half forward flanker, he kicked 27 goals in 1919, 29 the following year and 27 again in 1921.

References

Holmesby, Russell and Main, Jim (2007). The Encyclopedia of AFL Footballers. 7th ed. Melbourne: Bas Publishing.

External links

1890 births
1965 deaths
Australian rules footballers from Bendigo
Australian Rules footballers: place kick exponents
South Bendigo Football Club players
Carlton Football Club players
Brighton Football Club players
Carlton Football Club Premiership players
Two-time VFL/AFL Premiership players